Pristimantis simoteriscus is a species of frog in the family Strabomantidae. It is endemic to Colombia and occurs in the Cordillera Central in the Tolima, Quindío, and Caldas Departments. There is also an unconfirmed record from the Valle del Cauca Department. The specific name simoteriscus is diminutive of simoterus, chosen because adult P. simoteriscus resemble juvenile individuals of Pristimantis simoterus.

Description
Adult males measure  and adult females  in snout–vent length. The snout is short and subacuminate in dorsal view, rounded in lateral profile. The tympanum is prominent. Skin of the dorsum has large flattened warts; the venter is coarsely areolate. The fingers and toes bear slightly expanded discs (those of outer fingers are the largest). The toes have lateral fringes but no webbing. The dorsum is pale yellowish-green to reddish brown and may have black dorso-lateral spots. The throat and venter are greenish yellow and have cream or pale brown spots. The iris is bronze with brown flecks and lines.

Habitat and conservation
It is found  under rocks, logs, and in the roots of grasses among Espeletia plants. It is an uncommon species that is threatened by habitat loss caused by agriculture activities and cattle grazing, in particular burning of the habitat to facilitate growth of grasses. Its range overlaps with the Las Hermosas National Natural Park.

References

simoteriscus
Amphibians of the Andes
Amphibians of Colombia
Endemic fauna of Colombia
Amphibians described in 1997
Taxa named by John Douglas Lynch
Taxonomy articles created by Polbot